is a professional Go player.

Biography 
Masaki Takemiya was born in Japan. He became one of the many disciples of the Minoru Kitani school. His rise to fame began when he was only 15 years old. He earned the nickname "9 dan killer" because he won several games against top rated players. His famous "cosmic style" of Go would become popular among fans. It focused on large moyo in the center of the board. He's known as keeping a consistent record of winning titles. The longest period in which he did not hold a title has only been 4 years.  He closed off 2005 with an impressive win of 16 straight games, which was stopped by Omori Yasushi in the qualifiers for the 3rd World Oza.

Outside of Go, Takemiya also won the biggest Japanese backgammon tournament, the 12th Saint of the Board title, by beating the former holder,  Abe Akiko.

Four of Takemiya's books have been published in English -- Enclosure Joseki (Kiseido Press), now out of print; Imagination of a Go Master (NEMESIS Enterprises), This is Go the Natural Way! (Hinoki Press); and Cosmic Go (Board N' Stones).

Style 
Takemiya is known for his "Double 4" fuseki when he uses white, where he usually starts the game like so:

Takemiya is a favorite among amateur go players because of his very thick playing style as black. His sanrensei (three star) openings involve plenty of fights.

The sequence of moves from 00-07 in the lower right corner involves a common joseki that creates a moyo in conjunction with the triangled stone. Takemiya often plays a variation of this joseki but has made a few innovations of his own such as the kosumi in response to the same corner approach in the upper right corner. The resulting sequence could result in moves 08-13, where 09 is the kosumi move.

Takemiya on go and dancing 
Takemiya's other great love is dancing. He says that go is more like a dance than a war and that learning to dance has made him a better go player. This has also influenced his style in his later years.

Titles and runners-up 
Takemiya is one of the top title holders in Japan.

Notes

External links 
 A review of his book in French
 Go style of Takemiya. Is it a good choice for you?

1951 births
Japanese Go players
Go (game) writers
Living people
People from Tokyo